David William Higgins (born 1 December 1972) is an Irish professional golfer.

Higgins was born in Cork. He is the son of European Seniors Tour golfer Liam Higgins. He was the country's leading amateur by the time he reached 21. Following match play victories over Pádraig Harrington in the finals of the South of Ireland and the Irish Amateur Close championships he decided to turn professional in 1994.

Higgins earned £67,000 in his rookie season on the European Tour in 1996 to finish just inside the top 100 on the Order of Merit. In 1997 he broke his left wrist and right elbow in a horse riding accident. On his return, he failed to immediately rediscover his form and dropped down to the second tier Challenge Tour in 1999.

In 2000 Higgins won three times on the Challenge Tour, and finished 2nd on the end of season Rankings, to graduate back to the European Tour for the following season. He failed to make an impact at the highest level and returned to the Challenge Tour in 2005. He again found success, finishing 12th on the rankings to earn another shot at the European Tour, but he was unable to maintain that form, again losing his card at the end of 2007.

Amateur wins
1989 Irish Boys Championship
1994 Irish Amateur Close Championship, South of Ireland Championship

Professional wins (7)

Challenge Tour wins (3)

Challenge Tour playoff record (1–1)

Other wins (4)
1995 PGA Ulster Open Championship
2012 Irish PGA Championship
2016 Titleist & FootJoy PGA Professional Championship
2021 Irish PGA Championship

Results in major championships

Note: Higgins only played in The Open Championship.

CUT = missed the half-way cut

Team appearances
Professional
PGA Cup (representing Great Britain and Ireland): 2017 (winners), 2022

See also
2005 Challenge Tour graduates
2012 European Tour Qualifying School graduates

References

External links

Irish male golfers
European Tour golfers
Sportspeople from Cork (city)
Sportspeople from County Kerry
1972 births
Living people